Kuthayyir ibn ‘Abd al-Raḥman (c. 660 – c. 723), commonly known as Kuthayyir ‘Azzah was an Arab 'Udhri poet of the Umayyad period from the tribe of Azd. He was born in Medina and resided in Hijaz and Egypt. In his poems he was occupied with his unfulfilled love to a married woman named 'Azza. Favorite topics in his poetry are love and panegyrics. He made acquaintance of the governor Abd al-Aziz ibn Marwan and the caliphs Abd al-Malik ibn Marwan, Umar ibn Abd al-Aziz and Yazid II. He is mentioned as one of the followers of the now-extinct Kaysaniyya sect of Shi'ism, which held that Ali's third son Muhammad ibn Al-Hanafiyya would return as the Mahdi.

References

See also
Jamil ibn Ma'mar
List of Arabic language poets
List of Shi'a Muslims

Poets from the Umayyad Caliphate
Love in Arabic literature
Shia Muslims
660 births
723 deaths
Azd
7th-century Arabs
8th-century Arabs